Welling Stadium was a greyhound racing stadium located on the west side of Wickham Street in Welling, South East London It is not to be confused with a football ground that existed to the east of the stadium and was situated on the east and south sides of Wickham Street.

Greyhound racing
A greyhound track was constructed at the rear of East Wickham House with an application to build a stand in 1932. The track was opened on 28 October 1932 by proprietor M J Mortimore and East Wickham House also owned by the Mortimore family was used as a clubhouse and bar. The racing was independent (not affiliated to the sports governing body the National Greyhound Racing Club).

Closure
The stadium closed due to a council closure order in 1937.

References

Defunct greyhound racing venues in the United Kingdom